Charles Edward Seabright (February 13, 1918 – March 18, 1981) was an American Football player from Wheeling, West Virginia, where he spent the majority of his professional career with the Pittsburgh Steelers. Seabright played both offense and defense with the Steelers from 1946–1950, including stints as the starting quarterback. Seabright started every game for the 1947 Steelers in a season that ended in a one-game playoff to eventual champion Philadelphia. The Pittsburgh Post-Gazette considered Seabright, who wore number 33, a star player during the championship run. Seabright was one of the last NFL players to play both offense and defense. In addition, Seabright is recognized as being the last professional football player to be a quarterback in the "single-wing" formation, the precursor to the T-formation regularly used by all NFL teams. Seabright began his professional football career with the Cleveland Rams in 1941. However, he left football from 1942-1944 to serve in combat in World War II.

College career
Seabright attended West Virginia University (1938–1941) where he is considered one of the two best players from that era, the other being Harry Clarke who went on to be a championship quarterback with the Chicago Bears. Seabright was inducted into the WVU Hall of Fame in 2004.

References

1918 births
1981 deaths
West Virginia Mountaineers football players
Pittsburgh Steelers players
Cleveland Rams players
Sportspeople from Wheeling, West Virginia